Charles Boyer (28 August 1899 – 26 August 1978) was a French-American actor who appeared in more than 80 films between 1920 and 1976. After receiving an education in drama, Boyer started on the stage, but he found his success in American films during the 1930s. His memorable performances were among the era's most highly praised, in romantic dramas such as The Garden of Allah (1936), Algiers (1938), and Love Affair (1939), as well as the mystery-thriller Gaslight (1944). He received four Oscar nominations for Best Actor. He also appeared as himself on the CBS sitcom I Love Lucy.

Life and career

Early years
Boyer was born in Figeac, Lot, France, the son of Augustine Louise Durand and Maurice Boyer, a merchant. Boyer (whose surname means "cowherd" in the Occitan language) was a shy small-town boy who discovered the movies and theatre at the age of eleven.

Early acting career
Boyer performed comic sketches for soldiers while working as a hospital orderly during World War I. He began studies briefly at the Sorbonne, and was waiting for a chance to study acting at the Paris Conservatory.

He went to the capital city to finish his education, but spent most of his time pursuing a theatrical career. In 1920, his quick memory won him a chance to replace the leading man in a stage production, Aux jardins de Murcie. He was successful. Then he appeared in a play La Bataille and Boyer became a theatre star overnight.

In the 1920s, he not only played a suave and sophisticated ladies' man on the stage but also appeared in several silent films.

Early French films
Boyer's first film was L'homme du large (1920), directed by Marcel L'Herbier. He had roles in Chantelouve (1921), Le grillon du foyer (1922), and Esclave (1922).

At first, he performed film roles only for the money and found that supporting roles were unsatisfying. However, with the coming of sound, his deep voice made him a romantic star.

Boyer focused on theatre work for a number of years. He returned to the screen with Infernal Circle (1928), Captain Fracasse (1929), and La barcarolle d'amour (1930).

Early trips to Hollywood
Boyer was first brought to Hollywood by MGM who wanted him to play the Chester Morris part in a French version of The Big House (1930), Révolte dans la prison (1931).

Boyer had an offer from Paramount to appear in a small role in The Magnificent Lie (1931) with Ruth Chatterton, directed by Berthold Viertel. It was his first English speaking role.

He went back to MGM to make Le procès de Mary Dugan (1931), the French version of The Trial of Mary Dugan (1929). He did Tumultes (1931) for director Robert Siodmak.

Then he did the English-language The Man from Yesterday (1932) with Claudette Colbert at Paramount again directed by Viertel. He had a choice small role in Jean Harlow's Red-Headed Woman (1932) at MGM.

Return to France

Boyer went back to France where he starred in F.P.1 Doesn't Answer (1932), Moi et l'impératrice (1933), Les Amoureux (1933) (The Sparrowhawk), and La bataille (1933) with Annabella. The last was also filmed in an English-language version called The Battle, with Merle Oberon replacing Annabella and Boyer reprising his role.

He did The Only Girl (1933) with Lilian Harvey and performed on the Paris stage in Le Bonheur which was another success. It would be the last time he appeared on the Parisian stage.

He returned to Hollywood for Caravan (1934) with Loretta Young at Fox. He was also in the French-language version Caravane, again with Annabella.

Then in France he starred in Liliom (1934), directed by Fritz Lang, his first classic.

Boyer starred in some English language movies: Thunder in the East (1934) and The Only Girl (1934).

In France he was in Le bonheur (1934), reprising his stage performance for director Marcel L'Herbier.

Walter Wanger

Boyer co-starred with Claudette Colbert in the psychiatric drama Private Worlds (1935) for Walter Wanger at Paramount.  He signed a five-year contract with Wanger.

Then he romanced Katharine Hepburn in Break of Hearts (1935) for RKO, and Loretta Young in Shanghai (1935) for Wanger.

Boyer became an international star with Mayerling (1936), co-starring Danielle Darrieux and directed by Anatole Litvak.  Boyer played Rudolf, Crown Prince of Austria.

Back in Hollywood he was teamed with Marlene Dietrich in The Garden of Allah (1936) for David O. Selznick. He and Dietrich were reunited on I Loved a Soldier (1936) for director Henry Hathaway at Paramount but the film was abandoned.

Boyer paired with Jean Arthur in History Is Made at Night (1937) for Wanger, and Greta Garbo in Conquest (1937) at MGM (where he played Napoleon Bonaparte). Boyer's fee for the latter was $150,000 but with all the re-takes he wound up earning $450,000.

Boyer returned to France briefly to make Orage (1938), opposite Michèle Morgan for director Marc Allégret.

Back in Hollywood he had the lead in Tovarich (1937) with Claudette Colbert, directed by Litvak.

In 1938, he landed his famous role as Pepe le Moko, the thief on the run in Algiers, an English-language remake of the classic French film Pepe le Moko with Jean Gabin, produced by Wanger. Although in the movie Boyer never said to costar Hedy Lamarr "Come with me to the Casbah," this line was in the movie trailer. The line would stick with him, thanks to generations of impressionists and Looney Tunes parodies. Boyer's role as Pepe Le Moko was already world-famous when animator Chuck Jones based the character of Pepé Le Pew, the romantic skunk introduced in 1945, on Boyer and his best-known performance. Boyer's vocal style was also parodied on the Tom and Jerry cartoons, most notably when Tom was trying to woo a female cat. (See The Zoot Cat).

Boyer made three films with Irene Dunne: Love Affair (1939) at RKO, When Tomorrow Comes (1939) at Universal and Together Again (1944) at Columbia.

World War II

He went back to France to make Le corsaire (1939) for Marc Allégret. He was making the movie in Nice when France declared war on Germany in September 1939. Production ceased on the declaration of war. Boyer joined the French army. The film was never completed, although some footage of it was later released.

By November, Boyer was discharged from the army and back in Hollywood as the French government thought he would be of more service making films.

Boyer played in three classic film love stories: All This, and Heaven Too (1940) with Bette Davis, directed by Litvak at Warners; as the ruthless cad in Back Street (1941) with Margaret Sullavan, at Universal; and Hold Back the Dawn (1941) with Olivia de Havilland and Paulette Goddard, at Paramount.

In contrast to his glamorous image, Boyer began losing his hair early, had a pronounced paunch, and was noticeably shorter than leading ladies like Ingrid Bergman. When Bette Davis first saw him on the set of All This, and Heaven Too, she did not recognize him and tried to have him removed.

Universal

In January 1942 Boyer signed a three-year contract with Universal to act and produce. The contract would cover nine films.

Before he started the contract he finished a film at Warners, The Constant Nymph (1943) with Joan Fontaine.

Boyer was reunited with Sullavan in Appointment for Love (1942) at Universal and was one of many stars in Tales of Manhattan (1942), directed by Julien Duvivier and Immortal France (1942). He became a US citizen in 1942.

He was one of many stars in Flesh and Fantasy (1943) which he also produced with Julien Duvivier at Universal. He was an uncredited producer on Duvivier's Destiny (1944).

In 1943, he was awarded an Honorary Oscar Certificate for "progressive cultural achievement" in establishing the French Research Foundation in Los Angeles as a source of reference (certificate).

Boyer had one of his biggest hits with Gaslight (1944) with Ingrid Bergman and Joseph Cotten. He followed it with Together Again (1944) re-uniting with Irene Dunne; Congo (1944), a short; and Confidential Agent (1945) with Lauren Bacall, at Warners.

Boyer began his post war career with Cluny Brown (1946) with Jennifer Jones directed by Ernst Lubitsch. He was Warners highest paid actor at this stage earning $205,000 in 1945.

In 1947, he was the voice of Capt. Daniel Gregg in the Lux Radio Theater's presentation of The Ghost and Mrs. Muir, played in the film by Rex Harrison. In 1948, he was made a chevalier of the French Légion d'honneur. That year he did a thriller A Woman's Vengeance (1948).

Another film he did with Bergman, Arch of Triumph (1948), failed at the box office and Boyer was no longer the box office star he had been. "If you are in a big flop, nobody wants you," he said later.

Broadway
Boyer went to Broadway, where he made his first appearance in Red Gloves (1948–49), based on Dirty Hands by Jean-Paul Sartre, which went for 113 performances.

In 1951, he appeared on the Broadway stage in one of his most notable roles, that of Don Juan, in a dramatic reading of the third act of George Bernard Shaw's Man and Superman. This is the act popularly known as Don Juan in Hell. In 1952, he won Broadway's 1951 Special Tony Award for Don Juan in Hell. It was directed by actor Charles Laughton. Laughton co-starred as the Devil, with Cedric Hardwicke as the statue of the military commander slain by Don Juan, and Agnes Moorehead as Dona Anna, the commander's daughter, one of Juan's former conquests. The production was a critical success, and was subsequently recorded complete by Columbia Masterworks, one of the first complete recordings of a non-musical stage production ever made. As of 2006, however, it has never been released on CD, but in 2009 it became available as an MP3 download.

Boyer did not abandon cinema: he had leading roles in The 13th Letter (1951), The First Legion (1952), and The Happy Time (1952). He had a character role in Thunder in the East (filmed 1951, released 1953) an Alan Ladd film.

Four Star Playhouse

Boyer moved into television as one of the pioneering producers and stars of the anthology show Four Star Playhouse (1952–56). It was made by Four Star Productions which would make Boyer and partners David Niven and Dick Powell rich.

Boyer returned to France to star in The Earrings of Madame de... (1953) for Max Ophüls alongside Darrieux. While there he was one of many names in Boum sur Paris (1953).

He returned to Broadway for Norman Krasna's Kind Sir (1953–54) directed by Joshua Logan which ran for 166 performances. (In the film version, Indiscreet (1958), Cary Grant was cast in Boyer's role.)

Back in Hollywood, Boyer had a support role in MGM's The Cobweb (1955).

He went back to France to star in Nana (1955) with Martine Carol and then to Italy for What a Woman! (1956) with Sophia Loren.

In 1956, Boyer was a guest star on I Love Lucy and had a cameo in Around the World in 80 Days (1956). In France he had the lead in Paris, Palace Hotel (1956).

He appeared as the mystery guest on the 10 March 1957 episode of What's My Line?

On 17 March 1957, Boyer starred in an adaptation for TV of the Pulitzer Prize-winning play, There Shall Be No Night, by Robert E. Sherwood. The performance starred Katharine Cornell, and was broadcast on NBC as part of the Hallmark Hall of Fame.

He appeared several times in Goodyear Theatre and Alcoa Theatre on TV.

In France, Boyer was one of several stars in It Happened on the 36 Candles (1957) and he co-starred with Brigitte Bardot in La Parisienne (1957) and Michele Morgan in Maxime (1958), the latter directed by Henri Verneuil.

In Hollywood Boyer had a strong supporting role as real life privateer Dominique You alongside  Yul Brynner’s Jean LaFitte in The Buccaneer (1958).

Boyer co-starred again with Claudette Colbert in the Broadway comedy The Marriage-Go-Round (1958–1960), but said to the producer, "Keep that woman away from me". The production was a hit and ran for 431 performances. Boyer did not reprise his performance in the film version. He kept busy doing work for Four Star.

1960s

Onscreen, he continued in older roles: in Fanny (1961) starring Leslie Caron; Demons at Midnight (1961), in France, the lead; MGM's remake of The Four Horsemen of the Apocalypse (1962); Adorable Julia (1962) with Lilli Palmer; several episodes of The Dick Powell Theatre; and Love Is a Ball (1963).

He was nominated for the Tony Award as Best Actor (Dramatic) in the 1963 Broadway production of Lord Pengo, which ran for 175 performances.

Later that same year Boyer performed in Man and Boy on the London and New York stage. The Broadway run only went for 54 performances.

Boyer was reunited with David Niven in The Rogues (1964–65), a television series also starring Gig Young. Niven, Boyer and Young revolved from week to week as the episode's leading man, sometimes appearing together, although most episodes wound up being helmed by Young since both Niven and Boyer had flourishing movie careers.

He had good support roles in A Very Special Favor (1965) with Rock Hudson; How to Steal a Million (1966) with Audrey Hepburn and Peter O'Toole; Barefoot in the Park (1967) with Robert Redford and Jane Fonda. He had cameos in Is Paris Burning? (1966) and Casino Royale (1967) and was top billed in The Day the Hot Line Got Hot (1968).

His career had lasted longer than that of other romantic actors, winning him the nickname "the last of the cinema's great lovers." He recorded a laid-back album called Where Does Love Go in 1966. The album consisted of famous love songs sung (or rather spoken) with Boyer's distinctive deep voice and French accent. The record was reportedly Elvis Presley's favorite album for the last 11 years of his life, the one he most listened to.

Boyer supported in The April Fools (1969) and The Madwoman of Chaillot (1969) and guest starred on The Name of the Game.

1970s
Boyer's son had died in 1965 and Boyer was finding it traumatic to continue living in Los Angeles so in March 1970 he decided to relocate to Europe.

Boyer's final credits included the musical remake of Lost Horizon (1973) and the French film Stavisky (1974), starring Jean-Paul Belmondo, the latter winning him the New York Film Critics Circle Award for Best Supporting Actor, and also received the Special Tribute at Cannes Film Festival.

Boyer's final performance was in A Matter of Time (1976) with Liza Minnelli and Ingrid Bergman, directed by Vincente Minnelli.

Radio
Boyer was the star of Hollywood Playhouse on NBC in the 1930s, but he left in 1939 "for war service in France," returning on the 3 January 1940, broadcast. When he went on vacation in the summer of 1940, an item in a trade publication reported: "It is an open secret that he doesn't like the present policy of a different story and characters each week. Boyer would prefer a program in which he could develop a permanent characterization." Boyer would later star in his own radio show entitled "Presenting Charles Boyer" during 1950 over NBC.

Personal life and death

Boyer became a naturalized citizen of the United States on June 15, 1942 in Los Angeles.

In addition to French and English, Boyer spoke Italian, German, and Spanish.

Boyer was the husband of British actress Pat Paterson, whom he met at a dinner party in 1934. The two became engaged after two weeks of courtship and were married three months later. Later, they moved from Hollywood to Paradise Valley, Arizona. The marriage lasted 44 years until her death.

Boyer's only child, Michael Charles Boyer (9 December 1943 – 23 September 1965), died by suicide at age 21. He was playing Russian roulette after separating from his girlfriend.

On 26 August 1978, Boyer died by suicide with an overdose of Seconal while at a friend's home in Scottsdale, Arizona. He was taken to the hospital in Phoenix, Arizona, where he died, two days after his wife's death from cancer, and two days before his own 79th birthday. He was interred in Holy Cross Cemetery, Culver City, California, alongside his wife and son.

Awards
Boyer never won an Oscar, though he was nominated for Best Actor four times in Conquest (1937), Algiers (1938), Gaslight (1944) and Fanny (1961), the latter also winning him a nomination for the Laurel Awards for Top Male Dramatic Performance. He is particularly well known for Gaslight in which he played a thief/murderer who tries to convince his newlywed wife that she is going insane.

He was nominated for the Golden Globe as Best Actor for the 1952 film The Happy Time; and also nominated for the Emmy for Best Continuing Performance by an Actor in a Dramatic Series for his work in Four Star Playhouse (1952–1956).

In 1960, Boyer was inducted into the Hollywood Walk of Fame with a motion pictures star and a television star. Both stars are located at 6300 Hollywood Boulevard.

Filmography

Features

Short subjects
 The Candid Camera Story (Very Candid) of the Metro-Goldwyn-Mayer Pictures 1937 Convention (1937) as himself (uncredited)
 Hollywood Goes to Town (1938) as himself
 Les îles de la liberté (1943) as narrator
 Congo (1945) as voice
 On Stage! (1949) as himself
 1955 Motion Picture Theatre Celebration (1955) as himself (uncredited)

Television
 Four Star Playhouse (29 episodes, 1952–1956) as Various characters
 Toast of the Town (2 episodes, 1953) as himself
 Charles Boyer Theater (1953) as himself / host
 The Jackie Gleason Show (1 episode, 1953) as himself
 I Love Lucy (1 episode, 1956) as himself
 Climax! (1 episode, 1956) as himself
 Hallmark Hall of Fame (1 episode, 1957)
 Playhouse 90 (1 episode, 1957) as himself
 A Private Little Party for a Few Chums (1957) as himself
 Goodyear Theatre (unknown episodes, 1957–1958) as Alternate Lead Player (1957–1958)
 Alcoa Theatre (3 episodes, 1957–1958) as man / Lemerrier / Dr. Jacques Roland
 What's My Line? (4 episodes, 1957–1958, 1962–1963) as himself - Mystery Guest
 The Dinah Shore Chevy Show (1 episode, 1960) as himself
 The Dick Powell Show (4 episodes, 1962–1963) as Carlos Morell / Andreas
 A Golden Prison: The Louvre (1964, presenter) as narrator
 The Rogues (8 episodes, 1964–1965) as Marcel St. Clair
 The Bell Telephone Hour (1 episode, 1966) as himself
 The Name of the Game (1 episode, 1969) as Henri Jarnoux
 Film '72 (1 episode, 1976) as himself

Broadway
 Red Gloves (1948–1949)
 Don Juan in Hell (1951–1952)
 Kind Sir (1953–1954)
 The Marriage-Go-Round (1958–1960)
 Lord Pengo (1962–1963)
 Man and Boy (1963)

Award nominations

Academy Awards

Golden Globe Awards

References

Bibliography

External links

 
 
 
 Sur le site Quercy.net À propos de Charles Boyer et de Figeac.
 Photographs and literature

1899 births
1978 deaths
1978 suicides
Academy Honorary Award recipients
Donaldson Award winners
French male film actors
French emigrants to the United States
French male silent film actors
French male stage actors
French male television actors
Burials at Holy Cross Cemetery, Culver City
Drug-related suicides in Arizona
Barbiturates-related deaths
Special Tony Award recipients
People from Lot (department)
Chevaliers of the Légion d'honneur
20th-century American male actors
20th-century French male actors
People from Paradise Valley, Arizona
Male actors from Phoenix, Arizona
French military personnel of World War I